John Richard Strachan (March 17, 1895 – December 11, 1970) was an American tennis player active in the 1910s.

Biography
He was born in San Francisco, California on 17 March 1895.

Strachan reached the semifinals of the U.S. National Championships in 1917 and the quarterfinals in 1913.

He died on 11 December 1970 in San Francisco, California.

External links 

American male tennis players
1895 births
1970 deaths
Tennis people from California